Koźliny may refer to the following places:
Koźliny, Kuyavian-Pomeranian Voivodeship (north-central Poland)
Koźliny, Łódź Voivodeship (central Poland)
Koźliny, Pomeranian Voivodeship (north Poland)